High&Low (stylized as HiGH&LOW), is a Japanese action media franchise centred around the Exile Tribe. Produced by Exile Hiro, the High&Low entertainment project consists of television series, various films and other media, including music, live tours, official SNS accounts, mobile games, books, manga, anime, and temporary themed establishments, comprising an all-encompassing fictional universe. In 2016, it grossed 2.7 billion yen and was the 15th-highest-grossing media franchise of Japan that year.

The High&Low franchise started in 2015 with a television drama High&Low: The Story of S.W.O.R.D., which was broadcast in October. One of its slogans was that every character in the franchise was a leading character.

Overview

High&Lows story began at a town that was once under the rule of a powerful organization called Mugen. But after a fight with the one enemy that they couldn't crush, the Amamiya Brothers, Mugen suddenly broke apart and became a legend of the past, and five new gangs that took control of the area were formed. Based on the initials of the five gangs that lead each territory, the town began to be known as the SWORD area.

Gangs in the world of High&Low

Mugen
Theme Song: Sandaime J Soul Brothers from Exile Tribe - "Mugen Road"

Founded by Kohaku, Tatsuya, and Tsukumo, and later joined by Cobra and Yamato, Mugen was the gang that used to control the area. It disbanded after a fight with the Amamiya Brothers.

The Amamiya Brothers
Theme Song: Ace of Spades feat. Hiroomi Tosaka - "Sin"

Masaki and Hiroto Amamiya are the brothers that even the powerful Mugen could not defeat. They have superior martial arts skills that can knock down hundreds of opponents. Their eldest brother, Takeru, disappeared years ago, and they were looking for him.

Sannoh Rengokai (Hoodlum Squad)
Theme Song: Doberman Infinity - "Do or Die"

Sannoh Rengokai was led by former Mugen's member Cobra. They took control of the northeastern part of the SWORD area and strived to protect the citizens of the Sannoh shopping street.

DTC 
Sannoh Rengokai's member Dan, Tettsu, Chiharu formed a small sub-unit called DTC. They often met in the Itokan Diner and joked together.

White Rascals
Theme Song: PKCZ® feat. Exile Shokichi - "Whiteout"

The all white-clad Rascals were based in a hip nightclub called Heaven ran by their boss Rocky. Following the principle of their boss, they fought to protect the women in the area.

Oya Koukou (Oya High School)
Theme Song: Doberman Infinity - "Jump Around ∞"

Oya Koukou was the high school where bad boys from all over Japan went to. As many of its graduates became yakuza, it was often considered as a reserve force for yakuza.

The Part-time School
The Part-Time School gang was consist of bad boys who refused to graduate and continued to fight each other. Many of them were older than 20. Their leader was Murayama.

The Full-time School
The Full-Time School was for high school students who went to school to fight. They were led by Todoroki. However, as new students like Fujio Hanaoka came to the school, the equilibrium of Oya Koukou Full-time School collapsed into various factions that competed for hegemony.

Rude Boys
Theme Song: Generations from Exile Tribe - "Run this Town"

Led by Smoky, the Rude Boys was consist of orphans who lived together in the Nameless Street as a family. All skillful of Parkour, they formed this army of their own to protect the Nameless Street.

Daruma Ikka
Theme Song: DJ Daruma from PKCZ® - "Voice of Red feat. GS"

Daruma Ikka was led by a menacing Hyuga Norihisa, whose family's gang was defeat by Mugen. Daruma Ikka was a gang of people who hated the Mugen and controlled all the rights of festivals in the area. Accompanied by his friend, the tousetsu brothers, ukyo and sakyo, they gather people who hates the Mugens and establish the daruma ikka gang

Mighty Warriors
Theme Song: PKCZ(R) feat. Afrojack, CRAZYBOY, ANARCHY, SWAY, MIGHTY CROWN (MASTA SIMON & SAMI-T)- "Mighty Warriors"

The highly fashionable and musically inclined Mighty Warriors led by ICE were a bunch of fierce fighters.  Based in the coastal regions near the SWORD area, they would do anything to accumulate money to achieve their dream of music and fashion.

Kuryu Group
Theme Song: Exile the Second - "One Time One Life"

The alliance organization of the nine yakuza groups controlled the black side of Japan.  Kuryu meant nine dragons.

Ichigo Milk
Theme Song: E-girls - "STRAWBERRY サディスティック"

The female counterpart of Sannoh Rengokai in the Sannoh district. All dressed in pink bosozoku style jackets, they drove around on their re-modeled bikes.

Chanson
The Korean gang who sought to control the SWORD area and expanded in Japan.

Doubt
Theme Song: Exile the Second - "ASOBO! feat. Far East Movement"

The vicious gang that kidnapped and sold women. They had a feud with the White Rascals.

Prison Gang 
The general name for all the gangs inside the prisons in the Rasen area near the SWORD area. There are several gangs in those prisons, and when a street gang member comes to those prisons, he must join one of those groups to protect himself in the dangerous environment of the prisons. However, Jesse, the later known " King of the Prison", creates a new gang on his own after he is imprisoned, and very soon his gang becomes the strongest of all. Jesse's gang consists only of people from the same Little Asia area as himself, which ensures their unity remains strong even when they go "outside"  the prison.

Television

Film

Anime

Music

Studio albums

Songs

Unreleased song

Video releases

Tours 
High&Low The Live(2016)

Events 

 HiGH&LOW THE BASE
 2016.07.05 - 08.31：Ultra Shiodome Paradise
 NTV×LIVE in SUMMER YOKOHAMA PKCZ×HiGH&LOW PREMIUM LIVE SHOW
 2016.08.05：Yokohama Red Brick Warehouse
 HiGH&LOW THE LAND / HiGH&LOW THE MUSEUM
 2017.06.14 - 09.10：Yomiuriland
 PKCZ®×High&Low Advance Screening Event & PREMIUM LIVE SHOW
 2017.11.06 - 11.07：Yokohama Arena
 PKCZ®×DTC -Yukemuri Junjou Hen- from High&Low Advance Screening Event & Premium Live Show
 2018.08.21：Makuhari Messe International Exhibition Hall 1-3
 High&Low THE WORST VS THE RAMPAGE from EXILE TRIBE Premiere Screening Event & Premium Live Show
 2019.09.17 - 09.18：Makuhari Messe
 High&Low THE WORST VS THE RAMPAGE from EXILE TRIBE On-Demand Screening  & Premium Live Show
 2019.12.26：Yokohama Arena

Manga

Game

Book

Others 

 In June, 2016, Exile Tribe's members appeared in NISSIN "CUP NOODLE" new commercial as their characters in the High&Low series.
 In October,2018, Kenjiro Yamashita, Kanta Sato, Taiki Sato, Shogo Yamamoto and Shogo Iwaya, appeared in a commercial for DHC Serum as their characters(Dan, Tettsu, Chiharu, Hikaru, and Ken) in the High&Low series.

Awards 

 JAPAN ACTION AWARDS 2016
 Best Action Scene: High&Low: The Story of S.W.O.R.D. Season1 Episode 6「RUDE BOYS」
 Best Action Director: Takahito Ouchi (High&Low: The Story of S.W.O.R.D. Season 1)
 Best Action Works:High&Low: The Story of S.W.O.R.D. Season 1
 JAPAN ACTION AWARDS 2018
 Best Action Scene:High&Low: The Movie 2 – End of Sky
 Best Action Director: Takahito Ouchi (High&Low: The Movie 2 – End of Sky)

References

External links 

  (in Japanese)
 

Action film franchises
Japanese action films
Japanese television series
Mass media franchises